The women's foil was one of seven fencing events on the fencing at the 1936 Summer Olympics programme. It was the fourth appearance of the event. The competition was held from 4 August 1936 to 5 August 1936. 41 fencers from 17 nations competed, with one additional fencer entered but withdrawing. Nations were limited to three fencers.

The competition format was pool play round-robin, with bouts to five touches. Not all bouts were played in some pools if not necessary to determine advancement. Two points were awarded for each bout won. Ties were broken through fence-off bouts in early rounds if necessary for determining advancement, but by touches received in final rounds (and for non-advancement-necessary placement in earlier rounds).

Results

Round 1

The top 4 finishers in each pool advanced to round 2.

Pool 1

Pool 2

Pool 3

Pool 4

Scheel won the play-off between herself, Aşani, and Thomas. It is unclear why Aşani did not face Vargha; in general, matches unnecessary to determine qualification were not played (and this reason is given in the official report, but Aşani would have advanced without the need for a play-off pool had she had the opportunity to, and successfully did, beat Vargha.

Pool 5

Pool 6

Round 2

The top 3 finishers in each pool advanced to the semifinals.

Pool 1

Locke defeated Bogen-Bogáti in the tie-breaker bout, repeating the result of the pool bout between the two.

Pool 2

Pool 3

Pool 4

Elek-Schacherer won the play-off against van der Klaauw. The bout between Elek-Schacherer and Kramer-Scholer is shown in the official report as a 5–5 bout with neither given credit for a win; this score is generally not possible under the competition format in use but the official report contains no explanation of the result.

Semifinals

The top 4 finishers in each pool advanced to the final.

Semifinal 1

Locke defeated Bogen-Bogáti in the tie-breaker bout, repeating the result of the pool bout between the two.

Semifinal 2

Final

The final eight fencers competed in a round-robin. Ties, including the three-way tie for second, were broken by touches received in this round rather than play-off bouts as in previous rounds.

References

Foil women
Olym
Women's events at the 1936 Summer Olympics